The Ice Cruise of the Baltic Fleet was an operation which transferred the ships of the Baltic Fleet of the Imperial Russian Navy from their bases at Tallinn, at the time known as Reval, and Helsinki to Kronstadt in 1918.

Operation
On 17 February 1918 Vladimir Lenin ordered the ships of the Baltic Fleet to leave their bases at Tallinn and sail to Helsinki. On 19 February, due to a new German offensive, the Baltic Fleet ordered the further transfer of ships located in Helsinki to Kronstadt. On the same day ships started leaving Tallinn. A general evacuation began on 22 February, with a group of four ships, led by the icebreaker Yermak, departing for Helsinki. They were followed on 24 February by a convoy of transport ships, accompanied by two submarines, three minesweepers and a minelayer.

By the time German troops entered Reval on 25 February, most of the Russian ships had already left, escorted by the icebreakers Yermak, Tarmo and Volynets. The operation, superintended by Alexey Schastny, succeeded in evacuating the bulk of the Baltic Fleet to Helsinki, where all of the ships had arrived by 5 March, with the exception of the submarine Edinorog, which had been crushed by ice.

On 12–13 April, German forces captured Helsinki. Russian sailors scuttled four submarines in Hanko harbour on 3 April, just before the 10,000-strong German Baltic Sea Division landed in support of the White Guard. The  submarines—AG 11, AG 15 and —were made by Electric Boat Co. in the United States. The German Army later returned all of the ships captured in Helsinki under the terms of the treaty of Brest-Litovsk.

All of the evacuated ships had reached Kronstadt or Petrograd by 22 April.

Importance
The ships transferred included:
 Four dreadnought battleships: Gangut, Petropavlovsk, Poltava, Sevastopol
 Three pre-dreadnought battleships: Andrei Pervozvanny, Respublika, Grazhdanin 
 Five armoured cruisers: Rurik, Admiral Makarov, Bayan, Gromoboi, Rossia
 Four cruisers: Bogatyr, Oleg, Aurora, Diana
 59 destroyers 
 Three gunboats: Grosjaschy, Chrabry, Chivinets
 12 submarines
 Three minelayers
 144 other ships

Two air force brigades and large amounts of military equipment were also transferred. The transferred ships went on to play an important role in the defence of Petrograd.

Citations and references

Cited sources

Further reading
Н. С. Кровяков. "Ледовый поход" Балтийского флота в 1918. Moscow, 1955. 	
В. И. Сапожников. Подвиг балтийцев в 1918. Moscow, 1954.

Conflicts in 1918
Imperial Russian Navy
Icebreakers
Ice Cruise
Allied intervention in the Russian Civil War
1918 in Russia
1918 in Estonia
1918 in Finland